Egmore, is located in north west part of Chennai City.

Egmore may also refer to:
 Egmore taluk, is a taluk.
 Egmore Central, is a railway station in Chennai.
 Egmore Museum, is a Museum.
 Egmore Eye Hospital, is a Hospital.
 Egmore (state assembly constituency), is a state assembly constituency.
 Egmore metro station,  is a Metro railway station on Line 2 of the Chennai Metro.